Andrew James Baddeley (born 20 June 1982) on The Wirral, Merseyside is an English middle-distance runner.

Career
He finished sixth in the 1500 metres final at the 2006 European Athletics Championships in Gothenburg. He also competed at the 2006 Commonwealth Games, and has a silver medal from the 2005 Summer Universiade.

He finished second in the 1500 metres final at the European Cup in Athletics 2007 in Munich, with a time of 3:48.08 minutes.

At the Bislett Games on 15 June 2007, Baddeley ran 3.51.95 for the mile which took almost 5 seconds off his personal best and moved him to 12th spot on the UK all time ranking list. He won the Dream Mile at the 2008 Bislett Games in a world leading time of 3:49.38, taking another 2 seconds off his lifetime best. Baddeley is a member of Harrow Athletics Club and competes in the British Athletics League matches when available for domestic duty. He won the short race at the Great Edinburgh International Cross Country in both 2008 and 2009.

He took part in the Beijing 2008 Olympics qualifying for the 1500m finals in which he finished in 8th place, the highest finished place for a British athlete since Michael East finished 6th in 2004 at the Athens Olympics.

He ran the 1500 metres at the 2009 World Championships but only managed to reach the semi-finals. A month after the Championships, he competed in the Fifth Avenue Mile and beat Bernard Lagat and Leonel Manzano among others to win the race. Also in 2009 he ran in the team which set a British record time of 14:54.57 in the 4×1500 metres relay.

Going into the 2010 European Athletics Championships, he had the European leading time of 3:34.50 (via a fifth-place finish at the British Grand Prix). He failed to reach the podium in a tactical 1500 m final and he finished in sixth place behind the Spanish team in Barcelona. He represented Europe at the 2010 IAAF Continental Cup and finished in fifth place, one spot behind European champion Arturo Casado. He returned to defend his Fifth Avenue Mile title but managed only third place on the occasion, finishing behind Amine Laâlou and Bernard Lagat.

On 11 August 2012 Baddeley became the holder of the UK parkrun record by completing the 5k multi-terrain course at the Bushy Park event in 13:48.

Personal life

Baddeley attended Calday Grange Grammar School, and then graduated from Gonville and Caius College, Cambridge with a first in Engineering.

Personal bests 

All information taken from IAAF profile.

References

External links 
 
 
 
 
 

1982 births
Living people
Sportspeople from Wirral
English male middle-distance runners
British male middle-distance runners
Olympic male middle-distance runners
Olympic athletes of Great Britain
Athletes (track and field) at the 2008 Summer Olympics
Athletes (track and field) at the 2012 Summer Olympics
Commonwealth Games competitors for England
Athletes (track and field) at the 2006 Commonwealth Games
Athletes (track and field) at the 2010 Commonwealth Games
Universiade silver medalists for Great Britain
Universiade medalists in athletics (track and field)
Medalists at the 2005 Summer Universiade
World Athletics Championships athletes for Great Britain
British Athletics Championships winners
AAA Championships winners
Parkrun
Alumni of Gonville and Caius College, Cambridge
People educated at Calday Grange Grammar School